White Cloud is an unincorporated community in Harrison Township, Harrison County, Indiana.

History
White Cloud was named for the frequent fog in the area. A post office was established at White Cloud in 1884, and remained in operation until it was discontinued in 1934.

Geography

References

Unincorporated communities in Harrison County, Indiana
Unincorporated communities in Indiana
Louisville metropolitan area